Boris Lobashkov (born 3 April 1921) was a Soviet sailor. He competed in the 6 Metre event at the 1952 Summer Olympics.

References

External links
 

1921 births
Possibly living people
Soviet male sailors (sport)
Olympic sailors of the Soviet Union
Sailors at the 1952 Summer Olympics – 6 Metre